Guo Da (born 9 June 1954) is a Chinese actor and sketch comedy performer. Guo is a member of Chinese Communist Party and CCP Central Military Commission Political Work Department Song and Dance Troupe.

Guo is notable for performing sketch comedy in CCTV New Year's Gala since 1987.

Biography
Guo was born in Xi'an, Shaanxi on June 9, 1954, with his ancestral home in Xiaoyi, Shanxi, his father died of illness in May 1954 before his birth, he was raised by his mother.

Guo entered Shanghai Theatre Academy in 1974, majoring in acting at the Acting Department, where he graduated in 1977. After graduating he was assigned to Xi'an Theatre to work as an actor for 10 years.

Guo performed sketch comedy in CCTV New Year's Gala since 1987.

Personal life
Guo married Wu Fang, who is a costume designer, the couple have a son, he is studying in United Kingdom.

Works

Film

Television

CCTV New Year's Gala

References

1955 births
Male actors from Xi'an
Shanghai Theatre Academy alumni
Male actors from Shaanxi
Living people
Chinese male film actors
20th-century Chinese male actors
21st-century Chinese male actors